Brimboal is a small inland town near the Dergholm State Park in Victoria, Australia.

Reference List

Towns in Victoria (Australia)